SafeBreach is a cybersecurity company based in Sunnyvale, California and Tel Aviv, Israel. The company has developed a platform that simulates hacker breach methods, running continuous "war games" to identify breach scenarios across network systems. SafeBreach is a pioneer in the emerging category of breach and attack simulation. The company's platform provides a “hacker's view” of an enterprise’s security posture to predict attacks, validate security controls and improve SOC analyst response. SafeBreach is funded by Sequoia Capital, Hewlett-Packard pathfinder, Deutsche Telekom Capital Partners and others.

History
 
SafeBreach was founded in September 2014 by CEO Guy Bejerano and CTO Itzik Kotler in Tel Aviv. Prior to founding the company, Bejerano had worked as a chief information security officer and Kotler had spent time in the Israel Defense Force's technology unit as a hacker. In July 2015, the company raised $4 million in seed funding from an investor group led by angel investor, Shlomo Kramer, and Sequoia Capital.
 
In July 2016, the company raised an additional $15 million in series A funding from existing investors along with participation from new investors Hewlett-Packard Enterprise, Deutsche Telekom, and Maverick Ventures.  XZBy this time, the company was operating in both Sunnyvale, California and Tel Aviv. In May 2018, the company raised $18 million in Series B funding from six investors. In April 2020 the company raised an additional $19 million in Series C funding from six investors. 

Around 70 percent of the company's personnel works at the Tel Aviv office (largely on research and development).

Products
 
In April 2021, Gartner VP of Research Peter Firstbrook included Breach and Attack Simulation among The Top Security & Risk Management Trends for 2021 as a tool to “provide continuous defensive posture assessments” and recommended it be used for establishing a continuous testing capability, for testing security control efficacy and prioritizing future investments, and for testing changes to security strategy.
 
SafeBreach's primary product is a continuous security validation platform that constantly runs breach simulations on a client's network to theoretically and proactively locate and remediate security issues. The platform simulates hacker breach methods such as brute force, exploits, and malware. Using a library of hacker breach methods called the "Hacker's Playbook," SafeBreach develops potential breach scenarios specific to a client's environment and runs simulations to identify whether or not the security defenses that are in place can defend itself. There are thousands of different possible breach scenarios depending on a client's unique network setup.
 
In February 2020, SafeBreach announced the release of two new capabilities, Risk-based Vulnerability Management Integration and Cloud Native Container Security - designed to address problems that face Security and Development teams.
 
In January 2021 SafeBreach announced their new Dashboards which enable security teams to aggregate data and reporting for better security visibility and more informed decision making.

References

External links
Official website

Technology companies based in the San Francisco Bay Area
Software companies established in 2014
Companies based in Sunnyvale, California